The 1941 Cincinnati Bearcats football team was an American football team that represented the University of Cincinnati as an independent during the 1941 college football season. In its fourth season under head coach Joseph A. Meyer, the team compiled a 6–3 record. The Bearcats won their rivalry games against Louisville and Miami (OH), but lost intersectional games to Boston University and Tennessee

Schedule

References

Cincinnati
Cincinnati Bearcats football seasons
Ohio Bobcats football|Cincinnati Bearcats football